The Tolkappiyar award is a Presidential Award for scholars in classical Tamil. It introduced in the year 2005. India. This award was instituted by the Central Institute of Classical Tamil functioning under the aegis of Ministry of Human Resource Development, for teaching, research and publication in classical Tamil. The award was named in honor of the ancient Tamil author, who is known for Tolkāppiyam. It carries a cash prize of Rs 5 lakh, a citation and a shawl.

Recipients
 Prof. Adigalasiriyar 2005–2006
 Dr. Iravatham Mahadevan 2009–2010
 Prof. Tamizhannal Periakaruppan 2010–2011
 Prof. S. N. Kandasamy 2012-2013
 Prof. Dakshinamurthy Ayyaswami 2014-2015
 Dr. R Kalaikkovan 2015–2016

References

Indian awards